Poppy Adams is a British television documentary director/producer and novelist.

Adams attended the Dragon School in Oxford and received a degree in Natural Sciences from Durham University.

Adams has made films for the BBC, Channel 4 and The Discovery Channel. Her first novel, The Behaviour of Moths, was shortlisted for the Costa First Novel Award in the 2008 Costa Book Awards.

Poppy Adams lives in London. She is married with three children.

Books 
 The Behaviour of Moths. Virago Press, 2008. , republished as The Sister. Knopf, 2008. .

References 

Year of birth missing (living people)
Living people
People educated at The Dragon School
English television directors
English television producers
English women novelists
21st-century English novelists
21st-century English women writers
Alumni of Hatfield College, Durham
British women television producers
British women television directors